This is a list of buildings that are examples of the Art Deco architectural style in Iowa, United States.

Charles City 
 Charles City School District Building (former Junior High School), Charles City, 1932
 Charles Theatre, Charles City, 1936
 Floyd County Courthouse, Charles City, 1940

Clinton 
 Ankeny Building, Clinton, 1931
 Farmers Insurance (former National Guard Building), Clinton, 1930s and 1947
 NelsoCorp Field, Clinton, 1937
 Washington Junior High School and Jefferson Grade School, Clinton, 1935

Davenport 
 Hotel Blackhack, Davenport, 1914
 Mac's Tavern (former C. A. Fick Building), Davenport, 1934
 Mississippi Lofts and Adler Theatre, Davenport, 1931
 Monroe Elementary School, Davenport, 1940
 United States Courthouse, Davenport, 1933

Des Moines 
 Argonne Armory, Civic Center Historic District, Des Moines, 1934
 AT&T Building (former Northwestern Bell Telephone Company), Des Moines, 1928
 Butler House, Des Moines, 1936
 Des Moines Art Center, Des Moines, 1948
 Des Moines Building, Des Moines, 1930
 Des Moines County Courthouse, Des Moines, 1940
 Des Moines Fire Department Headquarters, Des Moines, 1937
 Hotel Kirkwood, Des Moines, 1930
 Iowa-Des Moines National Bank Building, Des Moines, 1932
 Youngerman Block, Des Moines, 1935

Mason City 
 Engine House No. 2, Mason City, 1939
 Sundell House, Mason City, 1911
 United Methodist Church (former First Methodist Church), Mason City, 1951
 William C. and Margaret Egloff House, Mason City, 193

Sioux City 
 Badgerow Building, Sioux City, 1933
 Federal Building and United States Courthouse, Sioux City, 1932
 Grandview Park Bandshell, Sioux City, 1935
 Leeds Junior High School, Sioux City, 1939
 Roberts Stadium, Sioux City, 1933–42
 Sioux City Municipal Auditorium, Sioux City, 1938
 Warrior Hotel, Sioux City, 1930

Other cities 
 Allamakee County Courthouse, Waukon, 1940
 American Legion Memorial Building, Atlantic, 1939
 Audubon County Courthouse, Audubon, 1940
 The Avery Theater, Garner, 1931
 Bake's Barber Shop, Moville, 1935
 Big Slough Creek Bridge, Nichols, 1937
 Bremer County Courthouse, Waverly, 1937
 Bruce's Snowball Market No. 1 Addition, Perry, 1930
 Buchanan County Courthouse, Independence, 1940
 Capitol Theater, Burlington, 1937
 Cass County Courthouse, Atlantic, 1934
 Chariton Masonic Temple, Chariton, 1937
 Chickasaw County Courthouse, New Hampton, 1930
 City Hall, Lansing, 1938
 Clay County National Bank, Spencer, 1920s
 Community Building, Hastings, 1937
 Decorah Municipal Bathhouse and Swimming Pool, Decorah, 1937
 Des Moines County Court House, Burlington, 1940
 Estes Park Band Shell, Iowa Falls, 1931
 First United Brethren Church, Toledo, 1946
 Garner–Hayfield-Ventura Junior High School Auditorium and Gymnasium, Ventura, 1941
 Holly Springs Gymnasium and Auditorium, Holly Springs, 1941
 Humboldt County Courthouse, Dakota City, 1939
 Iowa City Press-Citizen Building, Iowa City, 1937
 Iowa Lakes Community College (former Estherville City Hall), Estherville, 1930
 Iowa State Bank & Trust Building, Fairfield, 1955
 Iowa State Highway Commission District 6 Building, Cedar Rapids
 Iowa Theater, Onawa, 1937
 Iowa Theater, Winterset
 Irwin Consolidated School, Irwin, 1918
 Jefferson Elementary School, Creston, 1937
 Jones County Courthouse, Anamosa, 1937
 Louisa County Courthouse, Wapello, 1928
 Malek Theatre, Independence, 1947
 Master Service Station, Waterloo, 1930
 Masters Building, Mount Pleasant, 1937
 New Providence School Gymnasium, New Providence, 1936
 Ocheyedan Town Hall, Ocheyedan, 1940
 Oleson Park Music Pavilion, Fort Dodge, 1938
 Paramount Theatre, Cedar Rapids, 1928
 Phenix School Apartments (former West Des Moines Elementary School), West Des Moines, 1939
 Pioneer Oil Company Filling Station, Grinnell, 1920s and 1931
 Princess Sweet Shop, Iowa Falls, 1935
 Reeve Electric Association Plant, Hampton, 1938
 Roshek's, Dubuque, 1929
 St. Olaf Auditorium, St. Olaf, 1939
 Spencer High School and Auditorium, Spencer, 1937
 State Savings Bank, Council Bluffs, 1947
 Surf Ballroom, Clear Lake, 1933
 United States Post Office, Cresco, 1937
 United States Post Office, Forest City, 1941
 United States Post Office, Mount Ayr, 1939
 United States Post Office, Mount Pleasant, 1935
 United States Post Office, Onawa, 1937
 United States Post Office, Sigourney, 1938
 United States Post Office and Courthouse, Dubuque, 1934
 Veterans Memorial Elementary School, Reno, 1949
 Warren County Courthouse, Indianola, 1939
 West Liberty Bridge, West Liberty, 1937
 Woodbine Normal and Grade School, Woodbine, 1931
 Woodlawn Cemetery Gates and Shelter, Washington, 1917 and 1926
 YMCA Building, Waterloo, 1931

See also 
 List of Art Deco architecture
 List of Art Deco architecture in the United States

References 

 "Art Deco & Streamline Moderne Buildings." Roadside Architecture.com. Retrieved 2019-01-03.
 Cinema Treasures. Retrieved 2022-09-06
 "Court House Lover". Flickr. Retrieved 2022-09-06
 "The Encyclopedia of Arkansas History and Culture". Archived from the original on 2019-01-04. Retrieved 2019-01-04.
 "New Deal Map". The Living New Deal. Retrieved 2020-12-25.
 "SAH Archipedia". Society of Architectural Historians. Retrieved 2021-11-21.

External links 
 

 
Art Deco
Art Deco architecture in Iowa